Parc Stadium is a multi-use stadium in Caracal, Olt county, Romania. It is currently used mostly for football matches, and is the home ground of FC Caracal. The stadium holds 12,000 people.

Gallery

External links
 Stadionul Parc at Soccerway

Football venues in Romania
Caracal, Romania